Ellescus is a genus of true weevils in the beetle family Curculionidae. There are about 16 described species in Ellescus.

Species
These 16 species belong to the genus Ellescus:

 Ellescus aurifer Sturm, 1826
 Ellescus bicolor Dejean, 1821
 Ellescus bipunctatus (Linnaeus, 1758)
 Ellescus borealis (Carr, 1920)
 Ellescus brevirostris Desbrochers, 1874
 Ellescus carpini Dejean, 1821
 Ellescus conspersus Chevrolat
 Ellescus ephippiatus (Say, 1831)
 Ellescus flavicans Dejean, 1821
 Ellescus infirmus (Herbst & J.F.W., 1795)
 Ellescus mongolicus Kuska, 1982
 Ellescus rubicundus Ziegler
 Ellescus rufus Dejean, 1821
 Ellescus scanicus (Paykull, 1792)
 Ellescus sericeus Dejean, 1821
 Ellescus variegatus Dejean, 1821

References

Further reading

External links

 

Curculioninae
Articles created by Qbugbot